Ch. Mohan Rao is an Indian molecular biologist. He holds a Ph.D. in chemistry from the University of Hyderabad. He was a visiting associate at the National Institutes of Health, US, during 1990–92. He was a visiting professor at the Tokyo Science University, Japan during 1996. Visiting Scientist, UTMB, Galveston, USA, Visiting Professor, Protein Research Institute, Osaka, Japan. Adjunct Professor, RMIT University, Melbourne, Australia. He was positioned as director for the Centre for Cellular and Molecular Biology in Hyderabad, India. He is CSIR-Distinguished Scientist and Sir JC Bose National Fellow at CCMB  He was awarded in 1999 the Shanti Swarup Bhatnagar Prize for Science and Technology, the highest science award in India,  in the Medical  Sciences category.

Career
Dr. Mohan Rao obtained bachelor's degree in botany, zoology and chemistry from the Osmania University in 1975.  In 1977, he obtained his master's degree in chemistry from Osmania University PG Centre Warangal presently known as Kakatiya University, Warangal.  In 1984, he received his doctoral degree from the University of Hyderabad. His this work was Photoacoustic Spectroscopy of Chemical and Biological Systems.He was awarded Honorary doctorate by the Kakatiya University and "Distinguished Alumnus" award by the University of Hyderabad. He is recipient of several major national awards. He is an elected fellow of the World Academy of Sciences (TWAS), Indian National Academy of Sciences, National Academy of Science (India), Indian academy of Sciences. He was the President of the Society of Biological Chemists (India), Indian Biophysical Society, Andhra Pradesh Academy of Science and the Telangana Academy of Sciences. He also served as the Executive Committee member for the Centre of Excellence of the Bioinformatics Centre (founded by Prof. Kuppamuthu Dharmalingam) of Madurai Kamaraj University in 2004.

References

External links
Videolink to European Union Horizon2020 

Living people
Recipients of the Shanti Swarup Bhatnagar Award in Medical Science
Scientists from Telangana
People from Telangana
1960 births
Indian geneticists
Telugu people
20th-century Indian biologists
People from Karimnagar district
Osmania University alumni
University of Hyderabad alumni